The Mars-class ships of the line were a class of two 74-gun third rates of the large class ships of the line, designed for the Royal Navy by Sir John Henslow.

Ships

Builder: Deptford Dockyard
Ordered: 17 January 1788
Launched: 25 October 1794
Fate: Broken up, 1823

Builder: Woolwich Dockyard
Ordered: 17 January 1788
Launched: 14 March 1797
Fate: Broken up, 1819

References

Lavery, Brian (2003) The Ship of the Line - Volume 1: The development of the battlefleet 1650-1850. Conway Maritime Press. .

 
Ship of the line classes
Ship classes of the Royal Navy